Cabin Creek is a tributary of the Kanawha River,  long, in West Virginia in the United States.

It flows in southern Kanawha County for most of its course, north-northwestward through the unincorporated communities of Republic, Carbon, Decota, Laing, Quarrier, Holly, Leewood, Eskdale, Ohley, Coal, Giles, Dawes, Miami, Sharon, Ronda, and Dry Branch, to the community of Cabin Creek, where it flows into the Kanawha River. The creek is paralleled by county roads for most of its course, and additionally by the West Virginia Turnpike from Giles to its mouth.

Cabin Creek was named for a nearby pioneer's cabin which was raided by Native Americans in the 1740s.

See also
List of rivers of West Virginia
Paint Creek–Cabin Creek strike of 1912

References 

Rivers of West Virginia
Rivers of Kanawha County, West Virginia
Rivers of Fayette County, West Virginia
Tributaries of the Kanawha River